Zakros (Linear B:  zakoro) is a site on the eastern coast of the island of Crete, Greece, containing ruins from the Minoan civilization. The site is often known to archaeologists as Zakro or Kato Zakro. It is believed to have been one of the four main administrative centers of the Minoans, and its protected harbor and strategic location made it an important commercial hub for trade to the east. Flinders Petrie related Zakro with Tjeker of the Sea Peoples.

The town was dominated by the Palace of Zakro, originally built around 1900 BC, rebuilt around 1600 BC, and destroyed around 1450 BC along with the other major centers of Minoan civilization. Extensive ruins of the palace remain, and are a popular tourist destination.

Geography
Zakros is sometimes divided into Epano Zakros (Upper Zakros), the portion higher up on the hillside, and Kato Zakros (Lower Zakros), the part near the sea. A ravine known as the "Ravine of the Dead" runs through both the upper and lower parts of the ancient site, named after the numerous burials that have been found in the caves along its walls.

The road passes through Palekastro where it doubles back towards the south. A comparatively large village, Zakros includes in its community the following smaller villages: Kato Zakros, Adravasti, Azokeramos, Kellaria, Klisidi and the small hamlets of Ayios Georgios, Sfaka, Kanava and Skalia. The asphalt road ends at Kato Zakros.

Archaeology
Zakro was first excavated by D.G. Hogarth of the British School of Archaeology at Athens and 12 houses were unearthed before the site was abandoned. In 1961, Nikolaos Platon resumed the excavation and discovered the Palace of Zakro. This site has yielded several clay tablets with Linear A inscriptions.

References

Further reading

External links

 Minoan Crete, Zakros page
 Minoan Crete, Epano Zakros page

Minoan sites in Crete
Populated places in ancient Crete
Former populated places in Greece
Populated places in Lasithi
Aegean palaces of the Bronze Age